The Southwest Territory, or the Territory South of the River Ohio was organized May 26, 1790. A month later, John Sevier was sworn in to represent it as Congressman from North Carolina's defunct 5th district, which was exactly the same area. It received a non-voting delegate briefly from 1794 to 1796, and was then organized to form the State of Tennessee on June 1, 1796.

List of delegates representing the district

See also
 List of United States congressional districts

References

At-large United States congressional districts
Territory
Former congressional districts of the United States